This is a list of German states by life expectancy at birth (average of 2016 to 2018) according to the Federal Statistical Office of Germany.

See also
 List of European countries by life expectancy
 List of European regions by life expectancy

References

External links 
 Federal Statistical Office

Life expectancy
Germany, life expectancy
Germany
Germany health-related lists